Josef Welzmüller (born 10 January 1990) is a German footballer who plays as a centre-back for Regionalliga Bayern club SpVgg Unterhaching.

Career

Early years
Welzmüller played for SB/DJK Rosenheim until 2009, where he moved to Landesliga Bayern-Südwest club SC Fürstenfeldbruck. He managed to achieve promotion to the Bayernliga with the club in 2012. Ahead of the 2012–13 season, he joined Bayernliga club SV Heimstetten.

SpVgg Unterhaching
Welzmüller signed with 3. Liga club SpVgg Unterhaching in June 2014. He made his debut for the club on 2 August in a 3–3 home win against Wehen Wiesbaden at Sportpark Unterhaching.

His first goal for the club came on 10 March 2018, a converted penalty kick in the 23st minute of a 1–1 away draw against SV Meppen.

During his stay with Unterhaching, he was appointed club captain. He has struggled with injuries during his career with the club, tearing his anterior cruciate ligament in September 2018, and again in September 2020. He signed a two-year contract extension with Unterhaching on 4 July 2022, keeping him at the club until 2024.

Personal life
Welzmüller has studied business administration. He is a triplet, and his brothers Maximilian and Lukas are also professional footballers.

References

External links
 
 

1990 births
Living people
Footballers from Munich
German footballers
Association football defenders
SV Heimstetten players
SpVgg Unterhaching II players
SpVgg Unterhaching players
3. Liga players
Regionalliga players
Oberliga (football) players